The Man From Mo'Wax is a 2016 documentary film about DJ and record label boss James Lavelle.

Directed by Matthew Jones, and produced by M.J. McMahon, Matthew Jones and Brian A. Hoffman. The Man From Mo'Wax had its European premiere as part of the 2016 BFI London Film Festival on 14 October 2016 and was given a cinema release in the United Kingdom on 30 October 2018.

Overview

The film follows Lavelle's life from childhood, documenting his rapid rise to fame following the founding of his record label Mo' Wax. The film focuses on various pivotal moments in Lavelle's career, starting with his days writing for Straight No Chaser, and putting on club nights in London. Lavelle's shift from A&R man to musical artist as part of UNKLE becomes the central theme, with his fractious relationship with DJ Shadow unfolding throughout.

Development
The film was initially produced under the working title The Man From UNKLE, and later Artist & Repertoire. The film makes extensive use of private archive footage provided by both Lavelle and Shadow. Over 700 hours of footage were unearthed by the filmmakers.

Reception
, The Man From Mo'Wax with a limited release, had grossed $25,502.

On review aggregator Rotten Tomatoes, the film holds an approval rating of 77% based on 13 reviews.
Time Out film critic Philip De Semlyen described it as “A warts-and-all tales of hubris and heavyweight beats”.

Charts

References

External links
 

2016 films
Films about music and musicians
2010s English-language films